The Unclassed is a novel by the English author George Gissing.<ref>{{cite book|author=John Sutherland|author-link=John Sutherland (author)|chapter-url=https://books.google.com/books?id=QzJ3yNVVqtUC&pg=PA645|chapter=The Unclassed|pages=645|title=The Stanford Companion to Victorian Literature|orig-year=1989|year=1990|isbn=9780804718424}}</ref> It was written during 1883 but revised, at the publisher's insistence, in February 1884 and shortly before publication.

It tells the story of a young, educated man, Osmond Waymark, who survives by teaching. He answers a magazine advertisement, placed by Julian Casti – a half-Italian who had felt himself to be rejected by society – for companionship and the two strike up a serious and deep friendship.

References

Further reading
 Harsh, Constance D. (1992). "Gissing's the Unclassed and the Perils of Naturalism," ELH, Vol. LIX, No. 4, pp. 911–938.
 Korg, Jacob (1963). George Gissing: A Critical Biography. Seattle: University of Washington Press.
 Matz, B.W. (1909). "George Meredith as Publisher's Reader," Fortnightly Review'', Vol. LXXXVI, pp. 282–298.

External links
 The Unclassed, at Project Gutenberg
 
 The Unclassed, Vol. II, Vol. III, at Internet Archive

Novels by George Gissing
1884 British novels
Chapman & Hall books
Victorian novels
Novels set in England
Novels set in the 19th century